Dixon University Center was a former higher education center made up of college and university-level programs from a consortium of schools in the Pennsylvania State System of Higher Education (PASSHE) located in Harrisburg, Pennsylvania. The facility was located on the former campus of Harrisburg Academy. The site was leased from 1988 until 1991, when it was purchased by PASSHE. In 2022, the campus was sold to the Jewish Federation of Greater Harrisburg to create the Alexander Grass Campus for Jewish Life.

Colleges and universities
 Bloomsburg University of Pennsylvania
 Evangelical Seminary
 Immaculata University
 Indiana University of Pennsylvania
 Lebanon Valley College
 Lock Haven University of Pennsylvania
 Millersville University of Pennsylvania
 Shippensburg University of Pennsylvania

References

External links
Official Website 

Universities and colleges in Harrisburg, Pennsylvania
Pennsylvania State System of Higher Education